"Where the Streets Have No Name (I Can't Take My Eyes Off You)" is a song by English synth-pop duo Pet Shop Boys. The song is a medley of U2's "Where the Streets Have No Name" and "Can't Take My Eyes Off You", a 1967 song by Frankie Valli, though in an arrangement informed by the 1982 disco version of the song by Boystown Gang rather than the original. The song accompanied "How Can You Expect to Be Taken Seriously?", the third single from their fourth studio album, Behaviour (1990), as a double A-side in the United Kingdom (both singles were released separately in the United States). Released in March 1991, the song became the duo's 15th consecutive top-20 entry in the UK, peaking at number four on the UK Singles Chart. The band have said that they thought the guitars in the original sounded similar to a sequencer.

Background and inspiration
In the liner notes for the album Discography: The Complete Singles Collection, the Pet Shop Boys stated that they wanted to turn "a mythic rock song into a stomping disco record."

Content
The Pet Shop Boys version differed significantly from the original version in its musical arrangement. In contrast to the U2 version's instrumental build-up, the Pet Shop Boys version opens abruptly with synthesized and sampled noises and a drum machine. The musical climax of the song is also changed in other elements; a background vocal sample of "burning down love" is played right at the start, and synthesized horns erupt with even higher notes immediately following each chorus. Singer Neil Tennant performs the lyrics with no vocal exertion or stresses, in contrast to Bono's performance. In addition, at the transition between "Where the Streets Have No Name" and "Can't Take My Eyes Off You", Tennant sings the two lines one after the other, with no change in pitch—pointing out the similarities in the two songs. Following the release of the single, U2 issued a statement saying "What have we done to deserve this?". Tennant mentioned to The People in 2002 that he had "managed at long last to patch things up with Bono" after meeting him at one of Elton John's homes in the south of France.

This version has been paired with "How Can You Expect to Be Taken Seriously?", a song criticising the insincere humanitarian messages of a number of pop stars during the 1980s and the institutionalization of rock and roll.

Critical reception
Nick Duerden from Record Mirror wrote, "A bizarre mixture of two completely different songs, on paper it reads like a painful nightmare. But on record, it gels rather well. Neil and Chris' Hi-NRG treatment of both tracks run ridiculously smoothly with added eloquence, forcing even the Boys' detractors to give credit where it's due. Carry on camping."

Live performances and recordings
To date, the Pet Shop Boys have performed the song live on six of their tours. The song was included in the main set list for 1991's Performance Tour and a recording of this from the Birmingham NEC in June 1991 was released on the VHS (and later DVD) Performance. The VHS performance of the song omits the Frankie Valli section due to a publishing issue, although the complete soundtrack was later restored to the DVD version in 2004. The song was also later performed sometimes on the 1994 Discovery tour, the 2002 Release tour, the 2004 Summer/Fall shows and the 2006 Cubism tour, of which a performance filmed in Mexico City on 14 November of the same year was included on the 2007 DVD Cubism. The song is performed in the current Dreamworld tour (2022).

Track listings

 UK 7-inch and cassette single
 Australian 7-inch and cassette single
 "Where the Streets Have No Name (I Can't Take My Eyes Off You)" (7-inch edit) – 4:33
 "How Can You Expect to Be Taken Seriously?" – 4:10

 UK 12-inch single
 "Where the Streets Have No Name (I Can't Take My Eyes Off You)" (extended mix) – 6:44
 "How Can You Expect to Be Taken Seriously?" (extended mix) – 6:03
 "Bet She's Not Your Girlfriend" – 4:28

 UK 12-inch single (remixes)
 "Where the Streets Have No Name (I Can't Take My Eyes Off You)" (David Morales remix) – 6:24
 "How Can You Expect to Be Taken Seriously?" (Mo Mo remix) – 6:51
 "How Can You Expect to Be Taken Seriously?" (Ragga Zone remix) – 6:27

 UK CD single
 "Where the Streets Have No Name (I Can't Take My Eyes Off You)" – 5:35
 "How Can You Expect to Be Taken Seriously?" (extended mix) – 6:03
 "Bet She's Not Your Girlfriend" – 4:28
 "How Can You Expect to Be Taken Seriously?" (classical reprise) – 3:05

 US 12-inch single
 "Where the Streets Have No Name (I Can't Take My Eyes Off You)" (12-inch dance mix) – 7:35
 "Where the Streets Have No Name (I Can't Take My Eyes Off You)" (Sound Factory mix) – 4:37
 "Where the Streets Have No Name (I Can't Take My Eyes Off You)" (Red Zone mix) – 6:18
 "Where the Streets Have No Name (I Can't Take My Eyes Off You)" (Eclipse mix) – 1:38
 "Where the Streets Have No Name (I Can't Take My Eyes Off You)" (Ska reprise) – 2:59
 "Where the Streets Have No Name (I Can't Take My Eyes Off You)" (7-inch version) – 4:33

 US and Canadian CD single
 "Where the Streets Have No Name (I Can't Take My Eyes Off You)" (original 7-inch mix) – 4:33
 "Where the Streets Have No Name (I Can't Take My Eyes Off You)" (12-inch dance mix) – 7:35
 "Where the Streets Have No Name (I Can't Take My Eyes Off You)" (Red Zone mix) – 6:18
 "Bet She's Not Your Girlfriend" – 4:27
 "I Want a Dog" (Techno Funk mix) – 4:06

 US and Canadian cassette single
 "Where the Streets Have No Name (I Can't Take My Eyes Off You)" (original 7-inch) – 4:31
 "Bet She's Not Your Girlfriend" – 4:28

Charts

Weekly charts

Year-end charts

References

1991 singles
1991 songs
Parlophone singles
Pet Shop Boys songs
Song recordings produced by Julian Mendelsohn
Songs written by Adam Clayton
Songs written by Bob Crewe
Songs written by Bob Gaudio
Songs written by Bono
Songs written by the Edge
Songs written by Larry Mullen Jr.